Phylo may refer to:

Phylo (Odyssey), a character in the Odyssey
Phylo (polychaete), a genus of worms
Phylo (video game), 2010

See also
Phyllo, a pastry dough
Philo (disambiguation)